3 Canal is a Trinidadian band and leading proponent of rapso, a musical style which combines elements of calypso, soca and rap. The group was formed in 1994 by Visual Artist Steve Ouditt and Performing Artists Wendell Manwarren and Roger Roberts. For the next 3 years they created and led their own Jouvay Band in the Trinidad Carnival. Jouvay is the pre-dawn ritual street procession which marks the opening of the Trinidad Carnival.  In 1997 3canal expanded to include Stanton Kewley and John Isaacs, they recorded their first song Blue, the theme song for their Jouvay Band that year. Since then 3 Canal has released numerous albums from the late 1990s to the present, including a greatest hits collection that includes songs from 1997 to 2004. 3 Canal celebrated its 25th anniversary as a musical entity 2022.

Discography 
 1998: A Rakak Kie Bonay (Rituals Music)
 1999: The Fire Next Time (Rituals Music)
 2000: 3 Canal 2000 (Rituals Music)
 2001: Heroes Of Wha? (Rituals Music)
 2005: Jab Jab Say... (Machete Music)

References 

Trinidad and Tobago musical groups